Alexander Nazir Esmail (born 18 July 1993) is a British actor, and former wrestler, who is best known for his role in the film Attack the Block.

Career
After making his debut in multi-award-winning fantasy film Attack the Block in 2011, Esmail was nominated for Best Ensemble at the 2012 Black Reel Awards along with the rest of the cast, but lost to The Help.

In 2012 he went on to star in films Payback Season and Strippers vs Werewolves. He also had roles in television shows Casualty and Switch. Popcorn n Roses named him number 2, behind Lucas Cruikshank, on their list of rising stars of 2012. He starred alongside Steve Coogan in Northern Soul. In 2013 he starred in the music video Infinity by Infinity Ink. In 2018 he signed on to play the character Scalpel in the animated dark fantasy film Dagon: Troll World Chronicles which is set to be released in 2019.

Filmography

References

External links
 

1993 births
Living people
English male film actors
English male television actors
21st-century English male actors
People from Islington (district)
Male actors from London
British people of Iraqi descent